Gregory Felipe Santos Rodrigues  (born February 17, 1992) is a Brazilian mixed martial artist who competes in the Middleweight division of the Ultimate Fighting Championship. He is an eight-time National BJJ Champion and he was the Smash Global MMA Middleweight Champion and former Legacy Fighting Alliance (LFA) Middleweight Champion.

Background
Born in Porto Velho, Gregory came to Manaus when he was still four months old. He was introduced to martial arts since he was five years old, starting out with capoeira, before migrating to jiu-jitsu at 8 years old and eventually becoming a black belt under Senseí Henrique Machado, who was also Ronaldo “Jacare” Souza’s jiu-jitsu coach. He became an eight-time national jiu-jitsu champion, jiu-jitsu world champion, and professional world champion in Abu Dhabi. He also trained in Olympic wrestling with professor Waldeci, joining the Brazilian wrestling cadet team and becoming the runner-up at Pan American wrestling championships in Nicaragua. In 2014, he moved to Rio de Janeiro to start his professional MMA career.

Mixed martial arts career

Early career
Starting his professional career in 2014, Rodrigues went 7–2 fighting mostly on the Brazilian regional scene, picking up wins in promotions such as ACB, where he picked up a first-round TKO victory at ACB 73 and winning the Smash Global Middleweight title also picking up a unanimous decision win at LFA 71.

He was invited to compete against Jordan Williams at Dana White's Contender Series 33 on September 15, 2020. He lost the fight via first-round knockout.

He would make his return to LFA, entering the four-man tournament for the LFA Middleweight Championship. In the first round, Rodrigues faced Al Matavao at LFA 102, where he knocked Matavao out in the second round. In the finals at LFA 108, Rodrigues stopped Josh Fremd within a round to claim the vacant LFA Middleweight Championship. Within days off the victory, Rodrigues was asked to compete in the UFC on short notice.

Ultimate Fighting Championship
Rodrigues, as a replacement for Maki Pitolo, faced Duško Todorović on June 5, 2021, at UFC Fight Night: Rozenstruik vs. Sakai. He won the bout via unanimous decision.

Rodrigues faced Jun Yong Park on October 23, 2021, at UFC Fight Night: Costa vs. Vettori. He won the fight via knockout in round two. This fight earned him Fight of the Night award.

Rodrigues faced Armen Petrosyan on February 26, 2022, at UFC Fight Night: Makhachev vs. Green. He lost the fight via controversial split decision. 10 out of 14 media outlets scored the fight for Rodrigues.

Rodrigues faced Julian Marquez, replacing Wellington Turman, on June 18, 2022, at UFC on ESPN 37. He won the bout in the first round via knockout. This win earned him his first Performance of the Night award.

Rodrigues faced Chidi Njokuani on September 17, 2022, at UFC Fight Night 210.  He won the fight via technical knockout in round two. This fight earned him the Fight of the Night award.

Rodrigues was scheduled to face Brad Tavares on January 21, 2023, at UFC 283. However, Tavares withdrawn from the bout due to an injury,  and he was replaced by promotional newcomer Brunno Ferreira. He lost the fight via knockout in the first round.

Championships and accomplishments
Ultimate Fighting Championship
Fight of the Night (Two times) 
Performance of the Night (One time) 
Legacy Fighting Alliance
 LFA Middleweight Champion (One time; former) 
 Smash Global
 Smash Global Middleweight Championship (One time; former)

Mixed martial arts record

|-
|Loss
|align=center|13–5
|Brunno Ferreira
|KO (punch)
|UFC 283
|
|align=center|1
|align=center|4:13
|Rio de Janeiro, Brazil
|
|-
|Win
|align=center|13–4
|Chidi Njokuani
|TKO (punches)
|UFC Fight Night: Sandhagen vs. Song
|
|align=center|2
|align=center|1:27
|Las Vegas, Nevada, United States
|
|-
|Win
|align=center|12–4
|Julian Marquez
|KO (punches)
|UFC on ESPN: Kattar vs. Emmett
|
|align=center|1
|align=center|3:18
|Austin, Texas, United States
|
|-
|Loss
|align=center|11–4
|Armen Petrosyan
|Decision (split)
|UFC Fight Night: Makhachev vs. Green
|
|align=center|3
|align=center|5:00
|Las Vegas, Nevada, United States
|
|-
|Win
|align=center|11–3
|Jun Yong Park
|KO (punches)
|UFC Fight Night: Costa vs. Vettori
|
|align=center|2
|align=center|3:13
|Las Vegas, Nevada, United States
|
|-
|Win
|align=center|10–3
|Duško Todorović
|Decision (unanimous)
|UFC Fight Night: Rozenstruik vs. Sakai
|
|align=center|3
|align=center|5:00
|Las Vegas, Nevada, United States
|
|-
|Win
|align=center|9–3
|Josh Fremd
|KO (punches)
|LFA 108
|
|align=center|1
|align=center|2:20
|Sioux Falls, South Dakota, United States
|
|-
|Win
|align=center|8–3
|Al Matavao
|KO (punch)
|LFA 102
|
|align=center|2
|align=center|1:02
|Shawnee, Oklahoma, United States
|
|-
|Loss
|align=center|7–3
|Jordan Williams
|KO (punches)
|Dana White's Contender Series 33
|
|align=center|1
|align=center|2:19
|Las Vegas, Nevada, United States
|
|-
|Win
|align=center|7–2
|Brandon Hester
|KO (body kick)
|SMASH Global 9
|
|align=center|1
|align=center|3:03
|Hollywood, California, United States
|
|-
|Win
|align=center|6–2
|Tanner Saraceno
|Decision (unanimous)
|LFA 71
|
|align=center|3
|align=center|5:00
|Atlanta, Georgia, United States
|
|-
|Win
|align=center|5–2
|Edilberto de Oliveira
|Submission (armbar)
|Jaguar Combat 1
|
|align=center|1
|align=center|4:59
|Manaus, Brazil
|
|-
|Win
|align=center|4–2
|Umar Gaisumov
|TKO (punches)
|ACB 73: Silva vs. Makoev
|
|align=center|1
|align=center|2:43
|Rio de Janeiro, Brazil
|
|-
|Win
|align=center|3–2
|Robert Reed
|TKO (submission to punches)
|Island Fights 39
|
|align=center|2
|align=center|1:12
|Pensacola, Florida, United States
|
|-
|Win
|align=center|2–2
|Marco Aurélio
|Submission (heel hook)
|Face to Face 13
|
|align=center|2
|align=center|0:54
|São Gonçalo, Brazil
|
|-
|Loss
|align=center|1–2
|Renato Rangel
|Decision (split)
|Face to Face 11
|
|align=center|3
|align=center|5:00
|Rio de Janeiro, Brazil
|
|-
|Win
|align=center|1–1
|Douglas Carvalho
|Submission (armbar)
|Face to Face 9
|
|align=center|1
|align=center|2:09
|Rio de Janeiro, Brazil
|
|-
|Loss
|align=center|0–1
|Bruno Lopes
|TKO (punches)
|Jungle Fight 73
|
|align=center|1
|align=center|1:05
|São Paulo, Brazil
|

See also 
 List of current UFC fighters
 List of male mixed martial artists

References

External links 
  
 

1992 births
Living people
Brazilian male mixed martial artists
Middleweight mixed martial artists
Mixed martial artists utilizing Brazilian jiu-jitsu
Brazilian practitioners of Brazilian jiu-jitsu
People awarded a black belt in Brazilian jiu-jitsu
Ultimate Fighting Championship male fighters
Sportspeople from Rondônia